Parallel Universe is the eighth studio album by Japanese group Garnet Crow. The album was released on December 8, 2010, by Giza Studio.

Background
The lead single, "Over Drive", was released on April 14, 2010. The album's limited edition comes with a DVD of the band's concert, "GARNET CROW Symphonic Concert 2010 ~All Lovers~".

Chart performance
The album reached #10 rank in Oricon for first week with 15,773 sold copies. It charted for 7 weeks and sold 22,911 copies.

Track listing 
All tracks are composed by Yuri Nakamura, written by Nana Azuki and arranged by Hirohito Furui.

Note
 Only released on regular edition.

Usage in media
Tell Me Something was used as the ending theme for the TV show "Tonari no Terekin-chan"
Sora ni Hanabi was used as the ending theme for TBS program Uwasa no! Tokyo Magazine
As the Dew was used as the opening theme for anime Detective Conan
Over Drive was used as the theme song for anime movie Detective Conan: The Lost Ship in the Sky

References 

2010 albums
Being Inc. albums
Japanese-language albums
Giza Studio albums
Garnet Crow albums